Iberian cattle may refer to either or both of:

 the cattle breeds of Portugal, see List of Portuguese cattle breeds
 the cattle breeds of Spain, see List of Spanish cattle breeds